Scheen is a surname. Notable people with the surname include:

Céline Scheen (born 1976), Belgian soprano 
Kjersti Scheen (born 1943), Norwegian journalist 
Christopher Winther Scheen (1805–1850), Norwegian clergyman

See also
Sheen (surname)